Carrington is a locality in the Mid-Coast Council local government area of the Hunter and Mid North Coast regions of New South Wales, Australia, located on the northern shores of Port Stephens.

Carrington was named in 1828 by Robert Dawson, the first commissioner of the Australian Agricultural Company. The Newcastle suburb of the same name is named after his grandson, Lord Carrington, who became Governor of New South Wales.

Former church
A former church, built in 1847, which had subsequently been used as a youth hostel, is a heritage site.

References

External links

Suburbs of Mid-Coast Council
Populated places in New South Wales